Cooplands (Coopland & Son (Scarborough) Ltd) is the second largest bakery chain in the UK with over 160 outlets and 12 cafes located primarily across Yorkshire, County Durham and Lincolnshire in the United Kingdom. Cooplands produces takeaway food chiefly for the lunch-time trade, specialising in sandwiches, pasties, desserts, cakes, and bread. It competes with other local cafés and takeaway outlets, and national and international high street food chains and franchises.

By 2011, it had expanded to become the third largest bakery chain in the UK. In 2011 the company's annual turnover was £23 million.

In 2021 Cooplands was bought by the EG Group.

Cooplands of Doncaster is a completely separate bakery chain and is not connected to Cooplands (Coopland & Son (Scarborough) Ltd) in any way. The similar company name and business model led to much confusion in the past (see below).

History
Cooplands was founded as a single shop in Scarborough, North Yorkshire in 1885, and was incorporated in 1949.

In 1999, the company opened ten new stores, and expanded production at its Scarborough-based bakery with the creation of 80 new jobs. A further expansion was announced in June 2007 when it acquired the Hull-based bakery, Skeltons. The purchase added 34 outlets to the Cooplands chain.

In 2005, Cooplands was noted as being an "established NVQ training centre", and received a National Training Award for staff training. The same year it held a "Careers in the Bakery Industry" event, with career advisors discussing employment opportunities.

In April 2011, Woodhead Bakery, a rival Scarborough-based chain, fell into administration. Of the 29 Woodhead outlets, Cooplands bought 18, and the rest were purchased by the Haldane Retail Group.

In 2017, Cooplands received £8.5 million investment from BGF to accelerate the rollout of its shops across the north of England.

In October 2021, Cooplands was bought by the EG Group.

EG Group have now installed their first Coopland’s Bakery locations, fitted out alongside Asda on The Move forecourts at the following sites:

 King Edward Services, Retford
 Ashington Services, Pulborough

Cooplands Doncaster
The Doncaster-based Cooplands chain is in no way affiliated with Coopland & Son (Scarborough) Ltd. Coopland (Doncaster) Ltd. It has outlets across South Yorkshire, West Yorkshire, North Nottinghamshire and parts of Lincolnshire. It is a Private Limited Company, incorporated in 1933, with a 2011 turnover of £18.6 million.

In February 2015 Cooplands Doncaster announced it had gone into administration and would close 39 stores and its head office and bakery in Doncaster. However, on the same day, the business and certain assets of Alison's Coffee Shops, including 29 retail units were acquired by a new company, Cooplands Retail Ltd. The 150 employees of TACS (Alisons Coffee Shops) have been retained by Cooplands Retail Ltd and the business continues to trade as Cooplands from the 29 outlets throughout Yorkshire.

References

1885 establishments in England
Bakeries of the United Kingdom
Companies based in Eastfield, North Yorkshire
Food and drink companies established in 1885
Retail companies established in 1885
Scarborough, North Yorkshire